Gamma Ursae Majoris (γ Ursae Majoris, abbreviated Gamma UMa, γ UMa), formally named Phecda , is a star in the constellation of Ursa Major. Since 1943, the spectrum of this star has served as one of the stable anchor points by which other stars are classified.

It is more familiar to most observers in the northern hemisphere as the lower-left star forming the bowl of the Big Dipper, together with Alpha Ursae Majoris (Dubhe, upper-right), Beta Ursae Majoris (Merak, lower-right) and Delta Ursae Majoris (Megrez, upper-left). Along with four other stars in this well-known asterism, Phecda forms a loose association of stars known as the Ursa Major moving group. Like the other stars in the group, it is a main sequence star, as the Sun is, although somewhat hotter, brighter and larger.

Phecda is located in relatively close physical proximity to the prominent Mizar–Alcor star system.

Nomenclature

γ Ursae Majoris (Latinised to Gamma Ursae Majoris) is the star's Bayer designation.

It bore the traditional names Phecda or Phad, derived from the Arabic phrase  fakhth al-dubb ('thigh of the bear'). In 2016, the International Astronomical Union organized a Working Group on Star Names (WGSN) to catalog and standardize proper names for stars. The WGSN's first bulletin of July 2016 included a table of the first two batches of names approved by the WGSN, which included Phecda for this star.

To the Hindus this star was known as Pulastya, one of the seven rishis.

Properties

Gamma Ursae Majoris is an Ae star, which is surrounded by an envelope of gas that is adding emission lines to the spectrum of the star; hence the 'e' suffix in the stellar classification of A0 Ve. The estimated angular diameter of this star is about 0.92 mas. It has an estimated age of 300 million years.

Gamma Ursae Majoris is also an astrometric binary: the companion star regularly perturbs the Ae-type primary star, causing the primary to wobble around the barycenter. From this, an orbital period of 20.5 years has been calculated.

References

A-type main-sequence stars
Ursa Major Moving Group

Phecda
Ursae Majoris, Gamma
Big Dipper
Ursa Major (constellation)
Durchmusterung objects
Ursae Majoris, 64
103287
058001
4554
Astrometric binaries